Roman Vasilyevich Vintov (born 1 July 1978) is a former Russian professional football player. He also held Ukrainian citizenship as Roman Vasylyovych Vintov.

Club career
He played 2 seasons in the Russian Football National League for FC Arsenal Tula and FC Vityaz Podolsk.

Personal life
His younger brother Maksim Vintov is also a footballer.

External links
 

1978 births
Sportspeople from Kherson
Living people
Russian footballers
Association football defenders
FC Krystal Kherson players
FC Vityaz Podolsk players
FC Arsenal Tula players
FC Saturn Ramenskoye players
FC Petrotrest players
FC Olimp-Dolgoprudny players